Emma Webster is a British-American painter. She refabricates nature from still life models and scenographic studies.

Career
Webster's exhibitions have been reviewed in publications including The New York Times W Magazine ARTnews The New Yorker,  Los Angeles Times, Artforum International,  and Artsy; her paintings have appeared in Harper's Magazine, New American Paintings, and Jana Prikryl's Midwood (cover).

Notable collections 
 Institute of Contemporary Art, Miami, Fla.

Works about Emma Webster 
 Emma Webster: Green Iscariot, 2021, Alexander Berggruen
 Lonescape: Green, Painting and Mourning Reality, 2021, Emma Webster

References 

Living people
21st-century British painters
British women painters
British contemporary painters
American women painters
21st-century American painters
Painters from California
American landscape painters
British landscape painters
American contemporary painters
Year of birth missing (living people)